Charles Thomson Leckie (12 July 1875 – 1939) was a Scottish footballer who played in the Scottish Football League for Dundee and in the Football League for Derby County.

References

1875 births
1939 deaths
Scottish footballers
English Football League players
Association football wing halves
Dundee F.C. players
Derby County F.C. players
Scottish Football League players
Sportspeople from Clackmannanshire